The 2021 FIBA U16 Women's European Challengers were international basketball competitions which took place from 9 to 16 August 2021, replacing the cancelled 2021 FIBA U16 Women's European Championship. Top two teams from groups A, B and C qualified for the 2022 FIBA Under-17 Women's Basketball World Cup.

History
The 2020 edition of FIBA U16 Women's European Championship was to be held in Matosinhos, Portugal but was postponed to 2021 due to COVID-19 pandemic. 
Since the pandemic continued in 2021, the FIBA Europe decided to hold alternative format of competition to replace traditional format of U16 Women's European Championship where 16 or more teams gather in one place.

Structure
 The events are to be played on a voluntary participation basis, with promotion/relegation to be frozen across Divisions A, B and C.
 The Top 18 ranked teams (16 currently in Division A, plus two additional teams by 2019 ranking in respective category) to play three tournaments of six teams each (Groups A, B and C).
 All other registered teams, ranked 19 and lower, to play in tournaments of up to six teams each (Group D).
 One tournament of up to six teams to be created with the lowest-ranked teams to accommodate Division C and Small Countries. (Group E).
 All tournaments to be played in Round Robin format, with groups to be created by "serpentine" style allocation, taking the hosting situation into consideration.

Participating teams

Top-18 Challengers
 
 
 
 
 
 
 
 
 
 
 
 
 
 
 
 
 
 

19–24 Challenger
 
 
 
 
 
 

25–29 Challenger

Top-18 Challengers

Group A
The Group A tournament was played in Helsinki, Finland.

Group B
The Group B tournament was played in San Fernando, Spain. Hungary qualified for the 2022 FIBA Under-17 Women's Basketball World Cup as hosts.

Group C
The Group C tournament was played in Matosinhos, Portugal. Russia originally qualified for the 2022 FIBA Under-17 Women's Basketball World Cup, but were excluded due to their country's invasion of Ukraine and were replaced by Belgium.

19–24 Challenger

Group D
The Group D tournament was played in Piešťany, Slovakia.

25–29 Challenger

Group E
The Group E tournament was played in Tbilisi, Georgia.

See also
 2021 FIBA U20 European Challengers
 2021 FIBA U18 European Challengers
 2021 FIBA U16 European Challengers
 2021 FIBA U20 Women's European Challengers
 2021 FIBA U18 Women's European Challengers

References

External links
Official website
Competition schedule

FIBA Europe Under-16 Women's Challengers
FIBA U16 Women's European Championship
Women's basketball competitions in Europe between national teams
Europe
Sports competitions in Helsinki
Sport in San Fernando, Cádiz
Sport in Matosinhos
Sports competitions in Tbilisi
August 2021 sports events in Europe
2021 in youth sport